Second Hand Heart may refer to:

 Second Hand Heart (album), a 2015 album by Dwight Yoakam
 "Second Hand Heart" (Ben Haenow song)
 "Second Hand Heart" (Danny Gokey song)
 "Second Hand Heart" (Gary Morris song)
 Second-Hand Hearts, a 1981 American comedy film directed by Hal Ashby

See also 
 Hand heart, a gesture in which a person forms a heart shape using their fingers
 Second hand (disambiguation)